Chart Korbjitti (born 25 June 1954) is a Thai writer.

He first came to prominence with the publication of his novel Khamphiphaksa (The Judgment) in 1981. Named as Book of the Year by Thailand's Literature Council, the book won him the S.E.A. Write Award. He received a second S.E.A. Write Award in 1994 for Wela (Time). He was named a National Artist in Literature in 2004, and was among the honorees of the inaugural Silpathorn Award, given to Thai contemporary artists.

Biography 
Chart was born in the Khlong Sunak Hon area of Samut Sakhon province. In 1969, at the age of 15, he published his first short story, Nak Rian Nak Leng, in a school publication at Wat Pathum Khong Kha School.

His story Phu Phae won the Cho Karaket short story award in 1979 from Lok Nangsue magazine.

He has established himself as a full-time writer, stating, "I choose to be a writer. I give it my whole life. I have traded my whole life for it."

He has founded the publishing house Samnakphim Hon (Howling Books), which publishes all of his work.

Work 
Chart's books, in order of original publication date:
Thang Chana (ทางชนะ; 1979) novella, 
Chon Trok (จนตรอก; 1980), novella, 
Published in English in 2003 as No Way Out, 
Khamphiphaksa (คำพิพากษา; 1981), novel, 
Published in English in 1995 as The Judgment, 
Rueang Thamada (เรื่องธรรมดา; 1983), novella, 
Published in English in 2010 as An Ordinary Story, 
Mit Pracham Tua (มีดประจำตัว; 1984), collected short stories 1, 
Ma Nao Loi Nam (หมาเน่าลอยน้ำ; 1987), novella, 
Phan Ma Ba (พันธุ์หมาบ้า; 1988), novel, 
Published in English in 2002 as Mad Dogs & Co., 
Nakhon Mai Pen Rai (นครไม่เป็นไร; 1989), collected short stories 2,  
Wela (เวลา; 1993), novel, 
Published in English in 2000 as Time, 
Banthuek: Banthuek Rueang Rao Rai Sara Khong Chiwit (บันทึก: บันทึกเรื่องราวไร้สาระของชีวิต; 1996), essays, 
Raingan Thueng Phanathan Nayok Ratthamontri (รายงานถึง ฯพณฯ นายกรัฐมนตรี; 1996), novella, 
Lom Long (ลมหลง; 2000), screenplay, 
Ple Yuan Tai Ton Nun (เปลญวนใต้ต้นนุ่น; 2003), collected articles from Si San magazine 1999-2003, 
Borikan Rap Nuat Na (บริการรับนวดหน้า; 2005), collected short stories 3, 
Lorm Wong Khui (ล้อมวงคุย; 2008), collected articles from Si San magazine 2005-2007,

Adaptations 
Khamphiphaksa was made into a Thai film called Ai-Fak in 2004.

References 

Chart Korbjitti
Korbjitti, Chart
Korbjitti, Chart
Chart Korbjitti
S.E.A. Write Award winners
Chart Korbjitti
Chart Korbjitti
Chart Korbjitti
Chart Korbjitti